Mesembrinellidae is a family of Neotropical flies in the order Diptera, and formerly included in the Calliphoridae. There are 36 described species.

Taxonomy
Subfamily Laneellinae Guimarães, 1977
Laneella Mello, 1967
L. nigripes Guimarães, 1977
L. perisi (Mariluis, 1987)
Subfamily Mesembrinellinae Giglio-Tos, 1893
Albuquerquea Mello, 1967
A. latifrons Mello, 1967
Eumesembrinella Townsend, 1931
E. benoisti (Séguy, 1925)
E. cyaneicincta (Surcouf, 1919)
E. quadrilineata (Fabricius, 1805)
E. randa (Walker, 1849)
Giovanella Bonatto and Marinoni, 2005
G. bolivar Bonatto and Marinoni, 2005
G. carvalhoi Wolff et al., 2013
Henriquella Bonatto and Marinoni, 2005
H. spicata (Aldrich, 1925)
Huascaromusca Townsend, 1931
H. aeneiventris (Wiedemann, 1830)
H. bequaerti (Séguy, 1925)
H. decrepita (Séguy, 1925)
H. lara Bonatto and Marinoni, 2005
H. purpurata (Aldrich, 1922)
H. semiflava (Aldrich, 1925)
H. uniseta (Aldrich, 1925)
H. vogelsangi Mello, 1967
Mesembrinella Giglio-Tos, 1893
M. abaca (Hall, 1948)
M. apollinaris Séguy, 1925
M. batesi Aldrich, 1922
M. bellardiana Aldrich, 1922
M. bicolor (Fabricius, 1805)
M. brunnipes Surcouf, 1919
†M. caenozoica Cerretti et al, 2017
M. currani Guimarães, 1977
M. flavicrura Aldrich, 1925
M. patriciae Wolff, 2013
M. peregrina Aldrich, 1922
M. pictipennis Aldrich, 1922
M. semihyalina Mello, 1967
M. townsendi Guimarães, 1977
M. umbrosa Aldrich, 1922
M. xanthorrina (Bigot, 1887)
Thompsoniella Guimarães, 1977
T. andina Wolff et al., 2014
T. anomala Guimarães, 1977
Subfamily Souzalopesiellinae Guimarães, 1977
Souzalopesiella Guimarães, 1977
S. facialis (Aldrich, 1922)

References

 
Brachycera families